Plasmodium egerniae is a parasite of the genus Plasmodium subgenus Sauramoeba.

Like all Plasmodium species P. egerniae has both vertebrate and insect hosts. The vertebrate hosts for this parasite are reptiles.

Description 

The parasite was first described by Mackerras in 1961.

Both the schizonts and gametocytes of this species are large and nearly fill the host erythrocyte.

The schizonts measure 14 × 11 micrometres (µm).

Geographical occurrence 

This species is found in Queensland, Australia.

Clinical features and host pathology 

The only known host of this species is the lizard Egernia major major.

References 

egerniae